Bazlen is a surname. Notable people with the surname include:

Brigid Bazlen (1944–1989), American actress
Roberto Bazlen (1902–1965), Italian writer and publicist
Svenja Bazlen (born 1984), German triathlete